Berra Tor (grid reference ) is a granite tor on the south western edge of Dartmoor. It is only 132 metres above sea level so is one of the lowest tors on Dartmoor. It is quite isolated and hidden from everywhere else and is generally quite unknown. It juts out of some trees and resembles more of a rock than an outcrop on a hill, like Great Mis Tor and Yes Tor that also provide views. Its nearest settlement of size is Buckland Monachorum.

Notes

Tors of Dartmoor
Dartmoor